Inkberry is a common name for several unrelated plants:

 Any plant in the genus Phytolacca (pokeweeds)
 Especially Phytolacca americana (American pokeweed)
 Dianella nigra (turutu in Māori, New Zealand blueberry)
 Ilex glabra (evergreen winterberry)
 Ilex verticillata (American winterberry)
 Scaevola plumieri (beachberry), species of Scaevola (plant)